Inderbor, also known as Inderborskiy, (İnderbor, يندەربور; , Inderborskiy) is a town in Atyrau Region, southwest Kazakhstan.

Geography

References

Atyrau Region
Cities and towns in Kazakhstan